Stepan Sarkisyan (born 15 September 1962) is a former Soviet Armenian Freestyle wrestler. He's an Olympic silver medalist and European Champion and was awarded the Honoured Master of Sports of the USSR title in 1988.

Biography
Stepan was born on 15 September 1962 in the village of Shamut, Soviet Armenia. In 1976, his family moved to Vanadzor, where he started freestyle wrestling under teacher Hakob Gendzhyana. In 1981, he won the Junior World Championship.

Sarkisyan joined the USSR national freestyle wrestling team in 1984. That same year, he won a gold medal at the Wrestling World Cup team competition, defeating American Lee Roy Smith in the finals. Sarkisyan had a very successful career year in 1988, first when he became the Soviet Union Champion. Sarkisyan later won a gold medal at the 1988 European Wrestling Championships. As the European Champion, Sarkisyan qualified for participation at the 1988 Summer Olympics in Seoul. Sarkisyan easily and dominantly defeated all of his competition up to the finals, where he faced John Smith, younger brother of Lee Roy. Sarkisyan was unable to defeat Smith. He was awarded the Olympic silver medal.

The next year, Sarkisyan won his second gold medal at the Wrestling World Cup, defeating John Smith in a rematch in the finals, just as he had done to his brother five years ago. Sarkisyan competed at the 1989 World Wrestling Championships, but lost to Smith early in the tournament, resulting in Sarkisyan coming in sixth place. He won a silver medal in the 1990 Goodwill Games in Seattle. Sarkisyan left the Soviet national team in 1990 and, in 1991, he completed his wrestling career. He later worked as a sports official in now independent Armenia.

A freestyle wrestling international tournament dedicated to Stepan Sarkisyan takes place in Sarkisyan's hometown of Vanadzor, Armenia as of 1996. Wrestlers from Armenia, Russia, Georgia, Ukraine and Iran are invited to compete. Sarkisyan was president of the Wrestling Federation of Armenia from 1998-2002, and in 2002, was made the honorary president.

References

External links
Sports-Reference.com
Миндиашвили Д.Г. Антология вольной борьбы: даты, события, имена. — Красноярск, 2010. — 367 с.

1962 births
Living people
People from Vanadzor
Soviet male sport wrestlers
Armenian male sport wrestlers
Honoured Masters of Sport of the USSR
Olympic wrestlers of the Soviet Union
Wrestlers at the 1988 Summer Olympics
Olympic silver medalists for the Soviet Union
Olympic medalists in wrestling
Medalists at the 1988 Summer Olympics
Soviet Armenians
Armenian sports executives and administrators
Goodwill Games medalists in wrestling
European Wrestling Championships medalists
Competitors at the 1990 Goodwill Games